Suzanne Renaud (born 30 September 1889 in Lyon, France; died 21 January 1964, in Havlíčkův Brod) was a French poet and translator.

Life
Renaud moved from her native Lyon to Grenoble in 1894, and during World War I she worked at the military infirmary there. In 1926 she married the Czechoslovak poet Bohuslav Reynek in Grenoble, who had come to seek her permission to translate her poetry in 1923. For the next ten years they divided their time between France and Czechoslovakia, settling in the latter country definitively in 1936. She translated her husband's works into French, as he did for her. In the years 1947–1959 she corresponded with the French writer Henri Pourrat. She also translated the Czech poets Vladimír Holan and František Halas into French.

They had two sons: Daniel Reynek (1928–2014), a photographer, and Jiří Reynek (1929–2014), a graphic artist, poet and translator.

Works
Ta vie est là (Saint-Félicien-en-Vivarais: éditions du Pigeonnier, 1922)
Ailes de cendre (Pardubice: Vokolek, 1932), with illustrations by Bohuslav Reynek
Křídla z popele (Pardubice: Vokolek, 1935), translation of Ailes de cendre by Reynek
Victimae laudes (Pardubice: Vokolek, 1938), poetry collection
Dveře v přítmí (Kroměříž: Magnificat, 1946), translation by Reynek
Chvála oběti poems translated into Czech by Bohuslav Reynek (Brno: Atlantis, 1948)
Romarin ou Annette et Jean - Ballades et poésies populaires tchèques et moraves Renaud's translation of Czech and Moravian ballads and poetry

References

External links
French site about Suzanne Renaud and Bohuslav Reynek with examples of work
Article in French about Renaud at Radio Prague

Bibliography
Reynek, Bohuslav, Básnické spisy. ed Marie Chlíbcová (Peterkov: Archa, 2009).

Writers from Lyon
1889 births
1964 deaths
20th-century French poets
20th-century French translators
French emigrants to Czechoslovakia